Urethral sounding is the medical use of probes called sounds to increase the inner diameter of the urethra and to locate obstructions in it.

Risks 
If not conducted carefully, sounding carries a risk of irritation, tearing of the urethra, or of urinary tract infection. Infections may become serious if they progress to the bladder or kidneys, and should be referred to a doctor.

The insertion of foreign bodies into the urethra can present serious medical problems: see urethral foreign body.

Urethral play

Urethral play and urethral sounding are also used to refer to this practice in a sexual context.

Urethral play can involve the introduction of either soft or rigid items into the meatus of the penis (as well as farther in). Other toys and items, such as catheters, may be introduced deeper; in some cases even into the bladder.  Some items may even be allowed to curl several times or expand within the bladder. This action may be directly or indirectly associated with stimulation of the prostate gland and some types of bladder control.

See also 
 Urethral intercourse

References

Further reading 
 Hardy Haberman, Fetish Diva Midori. The Family Jewels: A Guide to Male Genital Play and Torment. Greenery Press, 2001. .

External links
 BMEzine.com article with links to images of urethral sounds
 Is the Penetration of the Urethra Even Possible?
 "Playing Doctor" Savage Love, October 18, 2001

Urologic procedures
Sexual acts
Urethra